The men's freestyle heavyweight competition at the 1932 Summer Olympics in Los Angeles took place from 1 August to 3 August at the Grand Olympic Auditorium. Nations were limited to one competitor. This weight class was not limited by maximum weight and was open to wrestlers above 87kg.

This freestyle wrestling competition did not use the single-elimination bracket format previously used for Olympic freestyle wrestling but instead followed the format that was introduced at the 1928 Summer Olympics for Greco-Roman wrestling, using an elimination system based on the accumulation of points. Each round featured all wrestlers pairing off and wrestling one bout (with one wrestler having a bye if there were an odd number). The loser received 3 points. The winner received 1 point if the win was by decision and 0 points if the win was by fall. At the end of each round, any wrestler with at least 5 points was eliminated.

Schedule

Results

Round 1

With only three wrestlers, there could only be three total bouts over three rounds. In the first, Hirschl had a bye while Richthoff defeated Riley by decision. This left Hirschl with 0 points, Richthoff with 1, and Riley with 3.

 Bouts

 Points

Round 2

In the second bout, Richthoff won again, this time over Hirschl. As the victory was by decision, Richthoff moved to 2 points; the other wrestlers finished the round with 3. Richthoff was assured of the gold medal after beating both the other wrestlers.

 Bouts

 Points

Final round

The final round, pitting the two wrestlers who had lost to Richthoff against each other, was in effect a silver/bronze match. Riley won to take the silver.

 Bouts

 Points

References

Wrestling at the 1932 Summer Olympics